Bare Creek is a watercourse that is part of the Middle Harbour catchment of Sydney Harbour that is located in the northern beaches region of Sydney, New South Wales, Australia.

Course and features

The main channel of the creek flows west through Garigal National Park, while the steep headwaters originate to the north of the sub-catchment, immediately south of Mona Vale Road.

Major land uses throughout the catchment area include the Austlink Business Park, low-medium residential development, non-urban bushland (outside the national park) and the Belrose Waste Management Facility. The sub-catchment is around 10 per cent impervious.

A mountain bike facility has been proposed for the catchment area surrounding Bare Creek.

See also 

 Rivers of New South Wales
 Pârâul Sterp, a river in Romania with a name literally translating as 'Bare Creek'

References 

Creeks and canals of Sydney